Éric Reinhardt (born April 2, 1965) is a French writer and publisher currently living in Paris.

Early life
Reinhardt grew up in a middle-class family approximately 30 kilometres from Paris in Corbeil-Essonnes. He attended preparatory classes in Paris at Collège-lycée Jacques-Decour before studying at ISG Business School with the aim of finding employment in the publishing world. Following the completion of his studies, Reinhardt commenced working in publishing before moving into publishing art books specifically.

Novelist
Demi-sommeil explored dealing with the loss of childhood and love. Le Moral des ménages, published in 2002 by Editions Stock is a critique of the middle class. Existence (2004), Cendrillon (2007) and Le Système Victoria (2011) continued in this vein, subjects covered included globalisation, world finance and the diktat of social achievement. L'Amour et les forêts (2014), Reinhardt's first novel published by Gallimard represented a change in topic to the world of the intimate in the spirit of Gustave Flaubert and Guy de Maupassant. Selling more than 100,000 copies, this novel won both Le Prix Renaudot des lycéens and Le Prix Roman France Télévisions in 2014.

A blend of truth and fiction, La Chambre des époux (2017) covered his wife's experience with breast cancer and his fear of losing her. Comédies françaises (2020) is a novel based on real events about the development of the internet and the impact of lobbyist Ambroise Roux who convinced Valery Giscard d'Estaing to halt French efforts based on the ideas of Louis Pouzin.

Bibliography

Novels
Demi-sommeil, Actes-Sud, 1998, 
Le Moral des ménages, Stock, 2002, 
Existence, Stock, 2004, 
Cendrillon, Stock, 2007, 
Le Système Victoria, Stock, 2011, 
L’amour et les forêts, Gallimard, 2014, 
La Chambre des époux, Gallimard, 2017, 
Comédies françaises, Gallimard, 2020,

Theatre
Leverage de quatre in L'Argent, Avant-Scène, 2009, 
Élisabeth ou l'Équité, Stock, 2013,

References

1965 births
ISG Business School alumni
French male novelists
Living people
Prix Renaudot des lycéens winners